The Presidents Cup is a biennial men's golf competition between a team representing the United States and an International Team representing the rest of the world without Europe. The first Presidents Cup took place in 1994.

For details of individual players' complete Presidents Cup records see: List of American Presidents Cup golfers and List of International Presidents Cup golfers.

Summary 
There have been a total of 452 individual matches played in the 14 Presidents Cups. Of these the United States has won 220, the International team has won 173 with 59 matches halved. Thus the United States have scored a total of 249 points to the International team's 202.

Holes-in-one 
No golfer has achieved a hole-in-one during the Presidents Cup.

Largest margins of victory in a match 
All victories completed with 5 or more holes left to play are listed.

United States

International

Pairings

Most frequent pairings 
Pairings used 5 or more times are listed.

United States

International

Age-related records 
The ages given are on the first day of the Presidents Cup. Generally the leading 5 in each category are given.

Youngest players

United States

International

Oldest players

United States 

Hale Irwin in 1994 and Fred Funk in 2003 were rookies.

International 

Masashi Ozaki in 1996 and Thongchai Jaidee in 2015 were rookies.

Captains 
Youngest Presidents Cup captain: Tiger Woods –  in 2019
Youngest International team captain: Trevor Immelman –  in 2022
Youngest non-playing United States captain: Fred Couples –  in 2009
Oldest Presidents Cup captain: Gary Player –  in 2007
Oldest United States captain: Ken Venturi –  in 2000

References

Records